Vadim Jean (born Bristol, 9 December 1963) is an English film director, producer, and executive producer.

Career
After graduating with a degree in history from Warwick University, he found work on Mike Figgis' Stormy Monday, before establishing his own production company in 1989 covering a wide variety of subjects, from sport to corporate videos.

He first came to public attention as a director when Leon the Pig Farmer won him the FIPRESCI International Critics' Prize at the 1992 Venice Film Festival, the Best Newcomer award from the London Critics' Circle, the Most Promising Newcomer at the Evening Standard British Film Awards, and the Chaplin Award for the best first feature from the Edinburgh International Film Festival.

He repeated his critical success in 1999 when One More Kiss won the Audience Award at the Atlantic Film Festival, and was nominated for Best Film at the International Filmfest Emden.

His Hollywood debut was Jiminy Glick in Lalawood starring Martin Short as his celebrity interviewing alter-ego, produced by Gold Circle films.  The film also features Steve Martin and Kurt Russell as themselves.  It was selected as the closing gala at the 2004 Toronto International Film Festival.

In 2010 he directed In the Land of the Free... a feature documentary narrated by Samuel L. Jackson.  It tells the story of three men known as the Angola Three who among them have spent over a century in solitary confinement in the Louisiana State penitentiary.  It was nominated best documentary at the 2011 Evening Standard British Film Awards.

Filmography

References

External links
 

1963 births
Living people
Alumni of the University of Warwick
English film directors
English film producers
People associated with the Discworld series